Trampa de Amor (English: Love Trap) is the original first album by the bachata music group Aventura, when they use to call themselves Los Tinellers (Los Teenagers). It was named after the song with the same name. It was released under Elca Productions & Rincón Musical. Seven of the ten tracks are the original versions of some of the group's songs. One of the songs, "Por Tu Orgullo (Because Of Your Pride)", was added to God's Project. The other six were added to Generation Next. These seven songs were added to these two albums with each of them being more modern remakes. The other 3 tracks were never put in other albums nor ever had a re-make.

Album cover
The album cover only featured Romeo and Lenny. This is because Henry and Mikey were late to the photo session due to getting stuck in train traffic. Elvin Polanco, who was in charge of the group at the time, mentioned this in an interview. He also mentioned that since the photo session was too expensive for them at the time, they did not have more money to pay the photographer for an extra hour. So he decided to only have the two members that were there. The other members agreed with the decision to release the production with only Romeo and Lenny on the cover because they were on the rush to release the album and the fact that they could not afford another photo session. Henry and Mikey were members of the group regardless of the album cover situation.

Track listing

References

External links
 Aventura official site
 Album Page From Buena Musica

1995 albums
1995 debut albums
Aventura (band) albums